Hilliard Lloyd Cheatham (March 20, 1919 – June 11, 1989) was an American football quarterback.

Cheatham was born in Oklahoma in 1919, but was raised in Alabama. He attended Carbon Hill High School in Carbon Hill, Alabama. He played college football at Auburn. He played at Auburn from 1939 to 1941, playing on both offense and defense at the quarterback and fullback positions, and earning a reputation as an outstanding blocker.

He was selected with the 14th pick in the 1942 NFL Draft and played for the Chicago Cardinals of the National Football League during the 1942 season. He appeared in 11 games for the Cardinals, three as a starter.

During World War II, he served in the military and played on the United States Naval Training Center Bainbridge football team.

After the war, Cheatham played for the New York Yankees of the All-America Football Conference from 1946 to 1948. He appeared in 38 games for the Yankees, 26 as a starter, catching 15 passes for 254 yards and three touchdowns.

After retiring from football, Cheatham worked as a zone manager for the Chevrolet Division of General Motors and later with Merrill Lynch Realty. He died in 1989 in Charlotte, North Carolina.

References

1919 births
1989 deaths
American football quarterbacks
Chicago Cardinals players
Bainbridge Commodores football players
New York Yankees (AAFC) players
Auburn Tigers football players
Players of American football from Alabama
Players of American football from Oklahoma